Live at Moers Festival is a live album by drummer Sunny Murray. It was recorded in June 1979 at the Moers Festival in Moers, Germany, and was released later that year by Moers Music. On the album, Murray is joined by saxophonist and bass clarinetist David Murray, and bassist Malachi Favors, and percussionist Cheikh Tidiane Fall.

Reception

The editors of AllMusic awarded the album 3 stars.

The authors of the Penguin Guide to Jazz Recordings awarded the album 3½ stars, and wrote: "The leader's playing... remains utterly distinctive, using a simple kit to create waves of rhythm and colour, dispersing marked time and controlling without dominating all the different areas of the music. David Murray is at something near his early, blistering best and, while the music is more a jam session than a charted course, the four themes provide enough material for the group to roister along. The in-concert sound is no more than acceptable, but the excitement survives any fidelity problems."

Track listing
All compositions by Sunny Murray.

 "Sweet Lovely" – 9:27
 "German Dilemma" – 15:01
 "Tree Tops" – 8:15
 "Happiness Tears" – 14:00

Personnel 
 Sunny Murray – drums
 David Murray – tenor saxophone, bass clarinet
 Malachi Favors – double bass, percussion
 Cheikh Tidiane Fall – congas

 Recorded on June 3, 1979, at the Moers Festival in Moers, Germany.

References

1979 live albums
Sunny Murray live albums
Moers Music live albums